Fatik may refer to the following:

Aziz al-Dawla, or Aziz al-Dawla Fatik, Armenian general and semi-independent Fatimid governor of Aleppo in 1016–1022
Fatik, the fictional sleuth  by Bengali author Shirshendu Mukhopadhyay